SS Regina may refer to:

 , in service 1884–1889
 , a ship that sank off Bradenton Beach, Florida, in 1940; wreck is a Florida Underwater Archaeological Preserve and listed on the National Register of Historic Places
 , a ship that sank in Lake Huron in the Great Lakes Storm of 1913; wreck is a dive site in the Sanilac Shores Underwater Preserve
 , a passenger ship built by Harland and Wolff for the Dominion Line in 1917
 , an ocean liner owned by Chandris Lines, scrapped in 1985.

See also
 
 

Ship names